is a large, historic garden in Takamatsu, Japan. It was completed in 1745 as a private strolling garden and villa for the local feudal lords, and opened to the public in 1875. Ritsurin is one of the largest strolling gardens in Japan, and a major tourist attraction for Kagawa Prefecture.

Ritsurin Garden lies in a former river bed on the east side of Mt. Shiun. Numerous ponds and small artificial hills dot the garden. The southern portion is in traditional Japanese style, with historic teahouses and numerous shaped pine trees. After becoming a public garden in 1875, the north portion underwent Western-style redesigns, and a large museum (currently the multipurpose Commerce and Industry Promotion Hall) and folk craft galleries were built in the center of the garden. For a time, the garden even housed a zoo and swimming pool, since closed and removed.

History
The buildings in the garden date back to the early 17th century. In 1625, the feudal lord of Takamatsu in Sanuki Province, Ikoma Takatoshi, began construction of Ritsurin, specifically the building of a garden around the South Pond using the beautiful greenery of Mt. Shiun ("Purple Cloud Mountain") as a backdrop. After Matsudaira Yorishige took control of the province, he continued the garden's construction. Work was completed by the Fifth Lord Yoritaka in 1745 after 100 years of improvements and extensions made by successive lords.

The new Meiji government came to power in 1868 and requisitioned the garden. Despite an initial proposal to build a silk mill, Ritsurin was designated a prefectural garden and opened to the public on 16 March 1875. In 1953, the garden was designated a Special Place of Scenic Beauty.

Features
The garden covers 750,000 square meters.
Among the features of the garden are:
 Kikugetsu-tei (Moon Scooping Pavilion): This teahouse located in the southern section of the garden was built in the early years of the Edo period (around 1640).
 Hakomatsu: Carefully cultivated black pine trees; their branches, twigs, and needles are elaborately trimmed into geometrical shapes and figures.
 Hiraiho and Fuyō-ho: two artificial mountains
 Wild Duck Hunting Moat
 Sai-ko (Western Lake)
 Nan-ko (Southern Lake)

The many ponds and streams are full of koi, sometimes fed by visitors.

Gallery

Access
JR Shikoku: Kōtoku Line, Ritsurin-Kōen-Kitaguchi Station 
Takamatsu-Kotohira Electric Railroad (Kotoden): Ritsurin-Kōen Station 
Kotoden Bus: Ritsurin Kōen Mae stop 
Kōsoku Bus Ritsurin Kōen Mae stop

See also

List of Special Places of Scenic Beauty, Special Historic Sites and Special Natural Monuments

References

Bibliography

External links

Ritsurin Garden
Comprehensive Database of Archaeological Site Reports in Japan, Nara National Research Institute for Cultural Properties

Gardens in Japan
Gardens in Kagawa Prefecture
Special Places of Scenic Beauty